Jeff Fenech (born 28 May 1964) is an Australian former professional boxer who competed between 1984 and 2008. He won world titles in three weight divisions, having held the IBF bantamweight title from 1985 to 1987, the WBC super-bantamweight title from 1987 to 1988, the WBC featherweight title from 1988 to 1990. He was awarded by the WBC his "fourth weight division" title at super-featherweight in November 2022 after the WBC recounted the bout in his rematch against Azumah Nelson. Fenech was trained by renowned Sydney-based trainer Johnny Lewis.
     
Jeff Fenech was inducted into the International Boxing Hall of Fame in 2002 and the Australian National Boxing Hall of Fame Moderns category in 2003, and became the 4th person to be elevated to Legend status in 2013.

Boxing career
Fenech was born in St Peters, Sydney and is of Maltese parentage. After playing junior rugby league and getting into trouble with the police as a child, Fenech was turned onto boxing when he attended the Newtown Police Boys Club in Sydney where he met Johnny Lewis. From there Fenech had a stellar amateur career, which led to him representing his country at the 1984 Summer Olympics in Los Angeles where he was selected as the boxing team captain. At the Olympics, Fenech lost a controversial quarter-final bout to Yugoslavian Redžep Redžepovski. Fenech was initially given the decision, but after intervention by the Olympic Boxing Committee and a total recount, the decision was reversed with Redžepovski being awarded the win. Many of the other boxers and those in the press felt that Fenech had been robbed of a chance to win an Olympic medal and most boxing writers noted how political amateur boxing was, especially at the Olympic Games.

It was that decision that led Fenech to turn professional later in 1984, and in his first professional fight he defeated Bobby Williams by a knockout in round two. Fenech quickly gained a reputation as a fast starter: he won his first eleven bouts by knockout, and held his first fight abroad in only his fourth fight, when he beat Iliesa Manila by a knockout in two rounds in Fiji.
   
He beat fringe contenders Wayne Mulholland and Rolando Navarro, both by a knockout in the fifth round, to start 1985. After those two wins, he was placed number one among the world's bantamweights by the International Boxing Federation. However, his early wins by KO had some of the press wondering if he could last the full 15 round distance.

Bantamweight champion
Fenech took only six professional fights to become the number one contender. He became the eighth-fastest boxer to fight for a world title after beginning his career when he challenged Satoshi Shingaki for the IBF Bantamweight title in only his seventh bout, displacing the second Davey Moore, and trailing Shingaki himself, Leon Spinks, Saensak Muangsurin, Pete Rademacher, Joves De La Puz, Joko Arter and Rafael Lovera. Fenech was the third fastest boxer to become a world champion, behind Muangsuring and Spinks, when he knocked out Shingaki in nine rounds in front of a packed house at the Horden Pavilion in Sydney. After two non-title knockout wins, he gave Shingaki a rematch at the State Sports Centre in Sydney and retained the crown with a knockout in three rounds. After one more non-title knockout win, Fenech had to go the distance for the first time, when he faced American Jerome Coffee at the Sydney Entertainment Centre, retaining the title by a 15-round unanimous decision.
   
In 1986, Fenech had only two bouts, but they were both major fights: He won a 10-round, non-title fight decision over former WBC bantamweight and future super bantamweight world champion Daniel Zaragoza, and he retained his IBF world championship with a TKO in round 14 over American Steve McCrory in a bout dubbed "Olympic Revenge" by Fenech's then promoter Bill Mordy. McCrory, like Fenech, had competed in the flyweight division at the Los Angeles Olympics, winning the Gold Medal by defeating Redžep Redžepovski in the final. After the bout at the Sydney Entertainment Centre, McCrory graciously allowed the Australian to wear his Olympic Gold Medal to show off to the crowd. During the fight with McCrory, Fenech wore green and red trunks, the colours of the South Sydney Rabbitohs rugby league team with their tough forward Mario Fenech (no relation) in his corner. McCrory was trained out of the Kronk Gym in Detroit.

Super bantamweight champion
1987 was a big year for Fenech. He went up in weight, and in his first fight as a super bantamweight, he defeated Tony Miller by a decision. Then the WBC super bantamweight champion, Samart Payakaroon, travelled to Australia to defend his belt against Fenech. Fenech became a two-weight world champion by knocking Payakaroon out in four rounds. For his next defense, he met future world bantamweight champion Greg Richardson and knocked him out in five. Next it was former WBC bantamweight champion Carlos Zarate's turn to challenge Fenech. Fenech retained his crown by a technical decision win in four rounds at the Perth Entertainment Centre, and then finished his year by knocking out Osmar Avila in one round in a non-title affair.

Featherweight champion
By 1988, Fenech had grown into a featherweight, and the WBC matched him with Puerto Rico's former world super bantamweight champion Victor Luvi Callejas for their vacant featherweight title, once again, in Sydney. Fenech joined boxing's exclusive group of fighters who have been world champs in three or more divisions, by knocking Callejas out in the 11th round. He retained that title twice before the year was over, knocking out Tyrone Downes and Georgie "Go Go" Navarro, both in the fifth round.
   
In 1989, he beat Marcos Villasana and former Julio César Chávez challenger Mario Martinez, both by decision.

Super featherweight title challenges
After that, Fenech took one year off and came back in 1991 as a super featherweight. After beating Johnny Calhoun by a knockout in four, he tried to become a four division world champion when he met Azumah Nelson. The fight was fought on the undercard to the Mike Tyson vs Razor Ruddock rematch at Caesars Palace in Las Vegas. After 12 ferocious rounds the bout was controversially declared a draw with many of the boxing press who were present (as well as Tyson) claiming that Fenech had been robbed of a clear win. Fenech has accused Nelson's promoter Don King of fixing the fight: "Him being Azumah Nelson and being under the Don King banner helped him because I believe the referee (Joe Cortez) didn’t let me do what I wanted to do, breaking up the fight, let Azumah hit me after the bell. People want to say I’m a dirty fighter but I only retaliate when someone does something to me. I’ve got no need to do something dirty at the start because I’m busy trying to cut the ring off and put pressure on. Like I said, although I won the fight, nobody tried to help me like that. The judging, the referring, everything was against me." On Monday 7 November 2022, a review of the fight by WBC Boxing retrospectively declared Fenech the winner, thus giving him a fourth world title.

Fenech returned to Australia and after beating Miguel Francia, Nelson travelled to Melbourne to offer Fenech a second title try. This time in front of over 30,000 fans at the Princes Park football stadium, Fenech suffered his first loss, when he was knocked out in the eighth round for Nelson to retain the world title. Fenech's TKO loss was recognized as the Ring Magazine Upset of the Year.

After that fight, he fought sporadically. In 1993, he was beaten in seven rounds by knockout by American former IBF featherweight champion Calvin Grove at the Rod Laver Arena in Melbourne, and in 1995, he beat Tialano Tovar, by a knockout in eight in New Jersey.

Lightweight title challenge
In 1996, in what was thought to have been his last fight (he fought Nelson a third time 12 years later), he lost to IBF lightweight champion Phillip Holiday of South Africa by a knockout in the second round. He retired after the bout.
   
Fenech retired with a record of 28 wins, 3 losses and 1 draw, with 21 wins by knockout.

Post-retirement career
Fenech was inducted into the Sport Australia Hall of Fame in 1986.

In retirement, Fenech has kept busy, and now he is the owner of a sports clothing brand that carries his name in Australia. In addition, he was inducted in 2002 into the International Boxing Hall of Fame in Canastota, New York.  Fenech has become a trainer training fighters such as Danny Green, Nedal Hussein, Hussein Hussein, Sakio Bika, and former IBF flyweight champion Vic Darchinyan.
   
On 5 January 2004, Fenech was attacked and stabbed by four men in Sydney, receiving facial cuts that required plastic surgery.

In June of the same year, the Fenech family home was attacked by shooters; seven bullets were recovered but no one was injured. Australian police believed the two attacks against Fenech are connected, ranging from a bar fight that Fenech had with a gang-member in 2003. The Australian newspaper quoted someone related to a Lebanese gang stating that "they will get him", but Fenech does not believe that the violent events are related.
   
In March 2005, Fenech became the trainer for former heavyweight champion Mike Tyson, in an effort to relaunch Tyson's career.

During the year 2020, Fenech trained Mike Tyson once again in preparation for Tyson's exhibition bout against Roy Jones Jr.

Despite repeated denials made in the popular press and on his website, Fenech pleaded guilty to his role in the 2005 theft of 3 gold watches worth a total of $327 from a Gold Coast, Queensland boutique store.  There was clear evidence of his involvement from in-store security cameras, revealing that Fenech actively participated in the incident.

Boxing comeback against Nelson
In March 2008, Fenech – at age 43 – announced a comeback to professional boxing and lost 22 kilos in preparation for the fight. He was to fight Azumah Nelson (who was 49 years old by this time) in what was later built up as the grudge match of the century. The two were to do battle on 24 June 2008 in Melbourne, Australia. A reality series/documentary on Fenech's life aired on Channel 9 and Fox Sports in the weeks leading up to the fight. On 24 June 2008, Fenech won the grudge match against Azumah Nelson by a majority decision, one judge scoring the fight a draw and the last two judges scoring it in favour of Fenech.
   
In June 2008, Fenech won the Shane Warne 888 Poker World Series of Poker Celebrity Bounty Event at Crown Casino. Fenech now appears at poker events around the world including the Aussie Millions and the World Series of Poker.

Amateur career
1983 Oceanic Flyweight champion  
1983 3rd place at Flyweight in World Championships in Rome, Italy. Results were:  
Defeated Marcelino Diaz (Colombia) points
Lost to Huh Yong-Mo (South Korea) points  
1983 3rd place as a Flyweight at Commonwealth Titles in Belfast, Northern Ireland. 
1984 Oceanic Flyweight champion 
1984 represented Australia as a Flyweight at Olympic Games in Los Angeles. Results were   
Round of 32: Defeated Rene Centellas (Bolivia) KO 3
Round of 16: Defeated David Mwaba (Tanzania) points  
Quarterfinal: Lost to Redzep Redzepovski (Yugoslavia) points

Professional boxing record

See also
List of boxing quadruple champions
List of IBF world champions
List of WBC world champions

References

Fenech, the official biography / Grantlee Kieza and Peter Muszkat (1988)  
Jeff Fenech: I love youse all / with Terry Smith (1993)  
Caricature portrait of Jeff Fenech, 1988 / Spooner   
Jeff Fenech during a training session, 1991 / David Mahony  
Jeff Fenech in tears ..., 1984 / Bruce Howard

External links

 

 

1964 births
Australian people of Maltese descent
People from Marrickville
Sportsmen from New South Wales
Boxers from Sydney
Boxers at the 1984 Summer Olympics
Olympic boxers of Australia
Bantamweight boxers
World Boxing Council champions
International Boxing Federation champions
International Boxing Hall of Fame inductees
Sport Australia Hall of Fame inductees
Australian male boxers
The Apprentice Australia candidates
Living people